Acetylmethionine sulfoxide reductase may refer to:
 Methionine-S-oxide reductase
 L-methionine (S)-S-oxide reductase